Joule is a monthly peer-reviewed scientific journal published by Cell Press. It was established in 2017 as a sister journal to Cell. The editor-in-chief is Philip Earis.

Abstracting and indexing 
The journal is abstracted and indexed in:

According to the Journal Citation Reports, the journal has a 2020 impact factor of 41.248.

References

External links 
 

Publications established in 2017
Cell Press academic journals
Sustainability journals
Delayed open access journals
Monthly journals